Javan Mard-e Ghassab Tomb (in Persian بقعه جوانمرد قصاب lit. "Chivalrous Butcher Tomb") is a building in Shahr-e Ray located in south of Tehran. The building dates back to the ruling era of Fath-Ali Shah Qajar. Javan Mard-e Ghassab is a semi-imaginary and semi-historic character whose name means 'chivalrous butcher'. The texts on the gravestone in the tomb show that it is the same old butcher considered legendary class. Javanmard-e-Ghassab Metro Station is located near the tomb.

See also 
 Javanmard-e-Ghassab Metro Station

Resources 
 Book در بیان کار سلاّخان و قصّابان، در چهارده رساله در باب فتوّت و اصناف، مهران افشاری و مهدی مداینی، تهران، نشر چشمه، ۱۳۸۱
 Book محمدحسین‌بن عبداللّه گریان شهرابی، کتاب طریق البکاء، تهران، شرکت سهامی چاپ و انتشارات کتب ایران، بی‌تا، صفحه ۷۵ـ ۷۸؛ صفحه ۶۷ـ۷۲

Tourist attractions in Tehran
Neighbourhoods in Tehran